Gondal Gilan (also Romanized as Gondal Gīlān and Gandal Gīlān) is a village in Oshtorinan Rural District, Oshtorinan District, Borujerd County, Lorestan Province, Iran. At the 2006 census, its population was 373, in 90 families.

References 

Towns and villages in Borujerd County